The Women's mass start event of the Biathlon World Championships 2015 was held on 15 March 2015. 30 athletes participated over a course of 12.5 km.

Results
The race was started at 14:30 EET.

References

Women's mass start
2015 in Finnish women's sport